Celejów  is a village in the administrative district of Gmina Wilga, within Garwolin County, Masovian Voivodeship, in east-central Poland.

References

Villages in Garwolin County